Fok Ming Shan (born 5 July 1958) is a Hong Kong archer. He competed at the 1984 Summer Olympics and the 1988 Summer Olympics.

References

External links
 

1958 births
Living people
Hong Kong male archers
Olympic archers of Hong Kong
Archers at the 1984 Summer Olympics
Archers at the 1988 Summer Olympics
Place of birth missing (living people)